Michel Jacques Boisrond (9 October 1921, Châteauneuf-en-Thymerais – 10 November 2002,  La Celle-Saint-Cloud) was a French film director and screenwriter. His work spanned five decades, from the 1950s to the 1990s.

Career

A former apprentice of Jean Delannoy, Jean Cocteau, and René Clair, Michel Boisrond debuted as a full-fledged director in 1955 with Cette Sacrée Gamine starring Brigitte Bardot.

His works typically fall into the comedy, romance, or comedy drama genres.

Filmography

References

External links
 

French film directors
1921 births
2002 deaths
20th-century French screenwriters
French television directors
People from Eure-et-Loir